Dajt is a former municipality in the Tirana County, central Albania. At the 2015 local government reform it became a subdivision of the municipality Tirana. The population at the 2011 census was 20,139. The municipal unit took its name from the Mount Dajt.

Seal 
The seal of the municipality derives from the coat of arms of the medieval Albanian noble family of Skurra.

References

Administrative units of Tirana
Former municipalities in Tirana County